The Slanderers is a 1924 American silent drama film directed by Nat Ross and starring Johnnie Walker, Gladys Hulette, and Billy Sullivan.

Cast

Preservation
With no prints of The Slanderers located in any film archives, it is a lost film.

References

Bibliography
 George A. Katchmer. A Biographical Dictionary of Silent Film Western Actors and Actresses. McFarland, 2009.

External links

1924 films
1924 drama films
Silent American drama films
Films directed by Nat Ross
American silent feature films
1920s English-language films
Universal Pictures films
American black-and-white films
1920s American films